Arcade Hotel may refer to:

Arcade Hotel (Tarpon Springs, Florida), listed on the National Register of Historic Places (NRHP)
Arcade Hotel (Springfield, Ohio), listed on the NRHP
Arcade Hotel (Hartsville, South Carolina), listed on the NRHP